The 1996 season of the astronomy TV show Jack Horkheimer: Star Hustler starring Jack Horkheimer started on January 1, 1996. During this season, the show still had its original name, Jack Horkheimer: Star Hustler. The show's episode numbering scheme changed several times during its run to coincide with major events in the show's history. During the 1996 season, in May, the show acquired an Internet presence along with its own website, starhusler.com. The episode numbers started including a "-I" appended to the end, marking the event. The official Star Gazer website hosts the complete scripts for each of the shows.


1996 season

References

External links 
  Star Gazer official website
 

Jack Horkheimer:Star Hustler
1996 American television seasons